Hyalobathra is a genus of moths of the family Crambidae. The genus was erected by Edward Meyrick in 1885.

Species
Hyalobathra aequalis (Lederer, 1863)
Hyalobathra archeleuca Meyrick, 1885
Hyalobathra barnsalis (Viette, 1957)
Hyalobathra coenostolalis (Snellen, 1890)
Hyalobathra crenulata Sutrisno & Horak, 2003
Hyalobathra dialychna Meyrick, 1894
Hyalobathra dictatrix Meyrick, 1934
Hyalobathra illectalis (Walker, 1859)
Hyalobathra inflammata Hampson, 1913
Hyalobathra intermedialis Caradja, 1939
Hyalobathra micralis Caradja, 1932
Hyalobathra minialis (Warren, 1895)
Hyalobathra miniosalis (Guenée, 1854)
Hyalobathra opheltesalis (Walker, 1859)
Hyalobathra paupellalis (Lederer, 1863)
Hyalobathra phoenicozona (Hampson, 1896)
Hyalobathra porphyroxantha (Meyrick, 1936)
Hyalobathra undulinea (Hampson, 1891)
Hyalobathra unicolor (Warren, 1895)
Hyalobathra variabilis J. F. G. Clarke, 1971
Hyalobathra wilderi Tams, 1935

Former species
Hyalobathra charopalis Swinhoe, 1907
Hyalobathra filalis (Guenée, 1854)
Hyalobathra metallogramma Meyrick, 1934
Hyalobathra retinalis (Saalmüller, 1880)
Hyalobathra rubralis Swinhoe, 1906
Hyalobathra seychellalis (T. B. Fletcher, 1910)
Hyalobathra veroniqueae Guillermet, 1996

References

 Sutrisno, H. & Horak, M. (2003). Australian Journal of Entomology 42: 233-248.

Pyraustinae
Crambidae genera
Taxa named by Edward Meyrick